Tritton is an English surname of Anglo-Norman origin.

Etymology

The name originates from an Anglo-Scandinavian combination of the personal name Trit and of the second element ton. The family name translates as "The farm of Trit". The first element Trit originates either from the Old East Norse dialect þryzker itself from Old Norse þrjózkr ("defiant"); compare with modern Swedish noun trots ("defiance"); meaning "The defiant one"  or from the Old Norse þróttr ("force", "power"); compare with modern Icelandic noun þróttur ("vigor", "force"); meaning the "The strong one". The second element ton originates from either Old English tūn or Old Norse tún, both sharing the same meaning ("enclosure", "settlement", "farm").

Region of origin
The surname also appears in the Lancashire Pipe rolls in the year 1203 with a certain Walter de Tritton, the latter being mentioned as owing half a mark "to be acquitted from an appeal, probably of murder". According to these same literary sources, the name disappears from the coasts of Normandy after the year 1204 coinciding therefore with the French invasion of Normandy (1202–1204).

The Scandinavian and later Norman origins of the name are also reinforced by several hypotheses among which we can cite the etymology of the Norwegian parish of Tretten, the existence of the German village of Trittenheim taking its roots from a Norsemen settlement on the edge of the river Moselle during the Viking raids in the Rhineland or also the italian surname Trittoni of Italo-Norman origin taking its roots from the Norman conquest of southern Italy.

People
Notable people with the name include:
Arthur Stanley Tritton  (1881–1973), British historian and scholar of Islam
David Tritton (1935–1998), British fluid dynamicist
Duke Tritton (1886–1965), Australian poet and folk singer
Sir Ernest Tritton, 1st Baronet (1845–1918), English banker and politician
 first of the Tritton baronets
Sir Geoffrey Ernest Tritton, 3rd Baronet (1900–1976), British businessman, soldier and politician
 third of the Tritton baronets
Joseph Henry Tritton (1894–1958), Australian lieutenant
Joseph Herbert Tritton (a.k.a. J. Herbert Tritton) (1844–1923), English banker
Lydia Ellen Tritton (1899-1946), Australian journalist, poet and public elocutionist
Nicholas Tritton (born 1984), Canadian judoka
Thomas R. Tritton, American academic administrator
Sir William Tritton (1875–1946), English expert on agricultural machinery

See also
Anglo-Norman families
157P/Tritton  periodic comet
46442 Keithtritton asteroid
Purcell Miller Tritton English architects, designers and historic building consultants

References

English-language surnames